Alexander Graves (August 25, 1844 – December 23, 1916) was a U.S. Representative from Missouri.

Born in Mount Carmel, Mississippi, Graves attended Centre College in Danville, Kentucky. At the outbreak of the Civil War, he joined the Confederate States Army and served under Gen. N.B. Forrest and was paroled with him at Gainesville, Alabama, in May 1865.
After being mustered out, he returned to college and was graduated from Oakland (later Alcorn) University, Mississippi, in July 1867.
He studied law.
He was graduated from the University of Virginia at Charlottesville in June 1869.
He was admitted to the bar and practiced law in Lexington, Missouri where he was city attorney in 1872.
He served as prosecuting attorney of Lafayette County, Missouri, in 1874.

Graves was elected as a Democrat to the Forty-eighth Congress (March 4, 1883 – March 3, 1885).
He was an unsuccessful candidate for reelection in 1884 to the Forty-ninth Congress.
He continued the practice of law until his death in Lexington, Missouri, on December 23, 1916.
He was interred in Machpelah Cemetery.

The Alexander and Elizabeth Aull Graves House was listed on the National Register of Historic Places in 1993.

References

1844 births
1916 deaths
People from Jefferson Davis County, Mississippi
Missouri lawyers
Alcorn State University alumni
Centre College alumni
Confederate States Army soldiers
Democratic Party members of the United States House of Representatives from Missouri
19th-century American politicians
People from Lexington, Missouri
19th-century American lawyers